Pablo Rodríguez Aracil (born 20 July 1985) is a retired Spanish professional footballer who plays as a forward.last played for Hougang United in Singapore Premier League

Club career
A youth graduate of local Levante UD and Valencia CF, Valencia-born Rodríguez only played lower league or amateur football in his country, representing UD Puçol, CD La Oliva, UD Almería B, CD Toledo, CD Olímpic de Xàtiva, Mazarrón CF, CD La Muela – his first Segunda División B experience, with the 2010–11 season ending in relegation – UD Altea and Deportivo Rayo Cantabria.

Abroad, Rodríguez started with Ethnikos Achna FC in the Cypriot First Division in 2008, moving to CS Mioveni in the Romanian Liga II the following year. After a brief spell in the Republic of Ireland, he returned to his homeland.

In the 2013 January transfer window, Rodríguez signed with United Sikkim F.C. in India. He made his first appearance in the I-League on 2 February, in a 1–2 loss against Shillong Lajong FC.

On 12 August 2013, Rodríguez joined Liga Nacional de Honduras side C.D. Marathón, his signing marking the seventh country he had played in. He made his debut on 8 September, scoring in a 1–2 home defeat to Deportes Savio.

On 17 March 2014, Rodríguez signed a contract with Kaya F.C. in the Philippines. He netted four goals in his first four matches, including two in a 3–1 away victory over Loyola Meralco Sparks FC.

Rodríguez moved teams and countries again in July 2014, signing for Brumunddal Fotball in Norway. He made his debut in the 2. divisjon against Valdres FK, scoring a hat-trick in a 4–0 home win.

In January 2015, Rodríguez joined Maldivian Dhivehi Premier League club Maziya S&RC. He went on to score 14 goals for Indonesia's Madura United F.C. before signing for S.League side Hougang United FC, but struggled initially at his new team.

Honours
Maziya S&RC
Maldivian FA Charity Shield: 2015

References

External links

Stats at Maldives Soccer

1985 births
Living people
Spanish footballers
Footballers from Valencia (city)
Association football forwards
Segunda División B players
Tercera División players
UD Almería B players
CD Toledo players
CD Olímpic de Xàtiva footballers
CD La Muela players
Deportivo Rayo Cantabria players
Cypriot First Division players
Ethnikos Achna FC players
Liga II players
CS Mioveni players
Bray Wanderers F.C. players
I-League players
United Sikkim F.C. players
Liga Nacional de Fútbol Profesional de Honduras players
C.D. Marathón players
Kaya F.C. players
Madura United F.C. players
Singapore Premier League players
Hougang United FC players
Spanish expatriate footballers
Expatriate footballers in Greece
Expatriate footballers in Romania
Expatriate association footballers in the Republic of Ireland
Expatriate footballers in India
Expatriate footballers in Honduras
Expatriate footballers in the Philippines
Expatriate footballers in Norway
Expatriate footballers in the Maldives
Expatriate footballers in Indonesia
Expatriate footballers in Singapore
Spanish expatriate sportspeople in Greece
Spanish expatriate sportspeople in Romania
Spanish expatriate sportspeople in India
Spanish expatriate sportspeople in the Philippines
Spanish expatriate sportspeople in Norway
Spanish expatriate sportspeople in Indonesia